The  was an infantry division of the Imperial Japanese Army. Unique amongst Japanese divisions, it was never given a call sign. The division was formed 1 September 1937 in Tokyo. The nucleus for the formation was the 13th Independent mixed brigade from Lu'an.  The men of the division were drafted from the Aichi mobilization district.

Background
The February 26 Incident in 1936 have exposed how much the 1st division was politicized and become dangerous to the regime itself. Therefore, to dispose of a disloyal Tokyo garrison, the 1st division was sent to Soviet border. As new troops were urgently needed after the Second Sino-Japanese War flared up in July 1937, the new division in Tokyo was raised anyway, but with much lower stature compared to normal line-of-battle divisions.

Action
The division was ordered to join Battle of Shanghai 11 September 1937 as part of the Shanghai Expeditionary Army. In December 1937, the division has also participated in the Battle of Nanking. At that period, the division have crossed Yangtze River and captured Zhenjiang. From March 1938, the 101st division has fought in the Battle of Xuzhou.

4 July 1938, the 101st division was incorporated into 11th army and proceed to participate in Battle of Wuhan until October 1938, in particular suffering heavy losses in the Battle of Wanjialing in September 1938. It also took part in the Battle of Nanchang in March - May 1939 and Battle of Changsha (1939) in October 1939.

The 101st division has started demobilization 7 November 1939, and was dissolved 25 February 1940.

See also
 List of Japanese Infantry Divisions

Notes
This article incorporates material from Japanese Wikipedia page 第101師団 (日本軍), accessed 14 June 2016

Reference and further reading

 Madej, W. Victor. Japanese Armed Forces Order of Battle, 1937-1945 [2 vols]
Allentown, PA: 1981

Japanese World War II divisions
Infantry divisions of Japan
Military units and formations established in 1937
Military units and formations disestablished in 1940
1937 establishments in Japan
1940 disestablishments in Japan